The Queensland women's rugby league team represents the Australian state of Queensland in rugby league football. Nicknamed the "Maroons", after the colour of their jersey, the team compete in the annual Women's State of Origin game against arch-rivals New South Wales. Coached by Tahnee Norris and captained by Ali Brigginshaw, the team is administered by the Queensland Rugby League.

Until 2017, the team competed in the Women's Interstate Challenge before the game was rebranded as State of Origin in 2018. From 1999 to 2015, the Maroons went on an unprecedented 17-year undefeated streak.

History
In 1999, Queensland played New South Wales for the first time at Brisbane's ANZ Stadium, with the Maroons' winning 18–16. The win started an undefeated streak that would last for 17 years. The team were originally nicknamed the "Brolgas".

In 2015, Queensland failed to defeat New South Wales for the first time, drawing with them 4–all at Townsville's 1300SMILES Stadium.

In 2016, New South Wales defeated Queensland for the first time, winning 8–4 at Cbus Super Stadium.

In 2018, the Women's Interstate Challenge was rebranded as State of Origin. On 22 June 2018, New South Wales won the first game under the State of Origin banner, defeating Queensland 16–10 at North Sydney Oval. In 2020, Queensland won their first game under the Origin banner, defeating New South Wales 24–18.

On 23 March 2021, Tahnee Norris, who played 13 interstate games for Queensland, was announced as new head coach of the side.

In March 2022, it was announced that the one fixture in 2022 would be played at Canberra Stadium on 24 June, and that from 2023 onwards, two Women's State of Origin matches would be played each season.

Players

Prior to 2019, the Queensland and New South Wales teams were largely selected under residency rules, meaning a number of players represented both states. Tahnee Norris, who captained Queensland, and Natalie Dwyer, both represented New South Wales before moving to Queensland, while Tarah Westera represented Queensland before moving south.

In 2019, the eligibility rules were revised to be more inline with the men's State of Origin rules. The residency rule was removed, which saw New Zealand representatives Maitua Feterika (Queensland) and Nita Maynard (New South Wales) ruled ineligible. Rona Peters was also ruled ineligible as she had previously represented New Zealand. This was later overturned and she was given special dispensation, as she had retired from international rugby league in 2015, before she first represented Queensland in 2016.

Current squad
The next scheduled fixture for the Queensland Women's Origin team is a match New South Wales on Friday, 24 June 2022. On 6 June, the QRL announced a squad of 22 players.  
Tallies in the table include the 2022 State of Origin match. 

Table last updated 26 June 2022.

Notes
 Zahara Temara kicked a field goal in the Round 4 match of the 2021 NRLW season.
 Millie Boyle and Tamika Upton signed with the  Newcastle Knights for the 2022 NRL Women's season, as announced on 18 May 2022.
 Lauren Brown signed with the  Gold Coast Titans for the 2022 NRL Women's season, as announced on 22 May 2022.
 Players named in the extended squad in early April 2022 that were excluded when the squad was trimmed to 22 in early June were: 
 Brianna Clark
 Jada Ferguson (played for Queensland Under 19's on 23 June 2022)
 Emma Manzelmann 
 Hagiga Mosby
 Jasmine Peters 
 Shaniah Power 
 Natassja Purontakanen
 Chante Temara
 Amy Turner (played for New Zealand against Tonga on 25 June 2022)

Key to icons used in the above table
 State Clubs:  Brisbane Tigers,  Burleigh Bears,  Central Queensland Capras,  North Queensland Stars,  Souths Logan Magpies,  Tweed Heads Seagulls,  Valleys Diehards,  Wests Panthers,  Wynnum Manly Seagulls,  Valkryies (2021 only),  Central Coast Roosters (NSW),  North Sydney Bears (NSW).
 All Stars:  Indigenous Allstars,  Māori Allstars,  All Stars
 National Championships:  Australian Defence Force,  Queensland Country,  South East Queensland.

Coaches
Accurate records were not kept in early years of the Women's Interstate Challenge by either the QRL or the NSWRL. The following list of coaches is therefore incomplete.

Results

2006
Played as a curtain raiser to the Round 21 NRL game between the Brisbane Broncos and Wests Tigers.

2007
Played as a curtain raiser to the Round 22 NRL game between the Penrith Panthers and North Queensland Cowboys.

2008
The Woman's Interstate Challenge was played as a two-game series in 2008.

Game 1

Game 2

2009
Played as a curtain raiser to the Round 19 NRL game between the Penrith Panthers and Canberra Raiders.

2010

2011
Played as a curtain raiser to Game I of the 2011 State of Origin series.

2012
Played as a curtain raiser to the Round 16 NRL game between the Penrith Panthers and Parramatta Eels.

2013

2014

2015
Played as a curtain raiser to the Round 16 NRL game between the North Queensland Cowboys and Cronulla-Sutherland Sharks.

2016
Played as a curtain raiser to the Round 20 NRL game between the Gold Coast Titans and Parramatta Eels.

2017
Played as a curtain raiser to the Round 20 NRL game between the St George Illawarra Dragons and Manly Warringah Sea Eagles.

2018
The first "official" State of Origin game.

2019

2020

2021

2022

Under 19 Women's team 
The Queensland squad for the 2022 Under 19 Women's match against New South Wales. The team was coached by Ben Jeffries. 
Tallies in the table below include the 2022 Under 19's Women's State of Origin match.

Notes
 Otesa Pule played for the Sydney Roosters Indigenous Academy team in the Tarsha Gale Cup in 2021 and 2022.
 Fiona Jahnke was the unused 18th player in the 2021 Under 19 Women's State of Origin match.

See also

Queensland Residents rugby league team
Queensland under-20 rugby league team
Queensland under-18 rugby league team
Queensland under-16 rugby league team
Queensland Women's rugby league team

References

External links

Queensland rugby league team
Rugby League State of Origin
Rugby league representative teams in Queensland
Women's rugby league teams in Australia